Best of Duets is a 2013 compilation album by Frank Sinatra. To commemorate the 20th anniversary of Frank Sinatra's groundbreaking and highly successful album, Duets, Capitol/UMe released a newly remastered Sinatra Duets – Twentieth Anniversary Best of Duets, a 14-song, single-disc collection featuring key tracks from both Duets and Duets II.

Track listing
"Come Fly With Me" (Sammy Cahn, Jimmy Van Heusen) (with Luis Miguel) – 4:17
"What Now My Love" (Gilbert Becaud, Carl Sigman, Pierre Leroyer) (with Aretha Franklin) – 3:15
"Come Rain or Come Shine" (Harold Arlen, Johnny Mercer) (with Gloria Estefan) – 4:04
"For Once in My Life" (Ron Miller, Orlando Murden) (with Gladys Knight and Stevie Wonder) – 3:18
"I've Got a Crush on You" (George Gershwin, Ira Gershwin) (with Barbra Streisand) – 3:23
"The Lady Is a Tramp" (Richard Rodgers, Lorenz Hart) (with Luther Vandross) – 3:24
"Moonlight in Vermont" (John Blackburn, Karl Suessdorf) (with Linda Ronstadt) – 4:07
"My Kind of Town" (Cahn, Van Heusen) (with Frank Sinatra Jr.) – 2:33
"Embraceable You" (G. Gershwin, I. Gershwin) (with Lena Horne) – 3:45
"Luck Be a Lady" (Frank Loesser) (with Chrissie Hynde) – 5:17
"I've Got You Under My Skin" (Cole Porter) (with Bono) – 3:32
"All the Way"/"One for My Baby (and One More for the Road)" (Cahn, Van Heusen)/(Arlen, Mercer) (with Kenny G) – 6:03
"New York, New York" (Fred Ebb, John Kander) (with Tony Bennett) – 3:30
"My Way" [Bonus track] (Paul Anka, Claude François, Jacques Revaux, Gilles Thibaut) (with Luciano Pavarotti) – 3:33

References

Frank Sinatra compilation albums
Compilation albums published posthumously
2013 compilation albums